The Yellowback is a 1929 American drama film directed by Jerome Storm and written by Randolph Bartlett and John Twist. The film stars Tom Moore, Irma Harrison, Tom Santschi, William Martin and Lionel Belmore. The film was released on January 20, 1929, by Film Booking Offices of America.

Cast      
Tom Moore as O'Mara
Irma Harrison as Elsie Loisel
Tom Santschi as Jules Breton
William Martin as Poleon
Lionel Belmore as McDougal

References

External links
 

1929 films
1920s English-language films
Silent American drama films
1929 drama films
Film Booking Offices of America films
Films directed by Jerome Storm
American silent feature films
American black-and-white films
1920s American films